Larcher is a surname. Notable people with the surname include:

Christian Larcher
Francisco Larcher, the current Argentine Subsecretary of Intelligence
Gérard Larcher (born 1949), French politician, former President of the Senate
Michelle Larcher de Brito (born 1993), Portuguese tennis player
Pierre Henri Larcher (1726–1812), French classical scholar and archaeologist
Rolf Larcher (born 1934), Swiss rower who competed in the 1960 Summer Olympics
Serge Larcher (born 1945), member of the Senate of France, representing the island of Martinique
Thomas Larcher (born 1963), Austrian composer and pianist

See also
Château-Larcher, commune in the Vienne department in the Poitou-Charentes region in western France